Antonio Despuig y Dameto (30 March 1745 – 2 May 1813) was a Spanish archbishop and cardinal. He was Archbishop of Seville (1795–1799) and Latin Patriarch of Antioch (1799–1813). He was born in Palma, Majorca. He was made a cardinal by pope Pius VII. He died in Lucca.

References

Bibliography 

Gaetano Moroni – Dizionario di erudizione storico ecclesiastica. Vol. 19º anno 1843.
Savini Nicci “Il Patriziato Sabino, il Collegio e l'Istituto Sabino per gli studi” (Archivio Vaticano).
S.S Pio VII “Motu Proprio” del 6 dicembre 1800.
Cardinale Giovanni Andrea Archetti “Decreto Esecutoriale” del 20 dicembre 1800.

External links

https://web.archive.org/web/20160305142808/http://mariottisolimani.altervista.org/

1745 births
1813 deaths
19th-century Spanish cardinals
Latin Patriarchs of Antioch
Roman Catholic archbishops of Seville
Cardinals created by Pope Pius VII